Malcolm II was King of the Scots from 1005 to 1034.

Malcolm II may also refer to:
 Máel Coluim II, Earl of Fife
 Maol Choluim II, Earl of Lennox